Kaire Palmaru (born 11 August 1984) is an Estonian footballer who plays as a midfielder for Saku Sporting. She is one of Estonia's most capped players of all time.

References

External links

1984 births
Living people
Estonian women's footballers
Estonia women's international footballers
FIFA Century Club
Women's association football midfielders
Pärnu JK players